Cowboy from Iran or  Cowboy uit Iran  is a 1999 Dutch TV film directed by Ilse Somers.

Cast
Edda Barends		
Marnie Blok		
Khaldoun Elmecky	... 	Amir
René Lobo		
Brechtje Louwaard		
Dennis Rudge		
Juan Carlos Tajes

External links 
 

Dutch drama films
1999 films
1990s Dutch-language films
Dutch television films